Roy Baird (1933-2010) was an English production manager, assistant director and producer, best known for his collaborations with Ken Russell, David Puttnam and The Who.

Select Credits
Lisztomania (1975)

References

External links

English film producers
1933 births
2010 deaths
20th-century English businesspeople